Homer Brightman (October 1, 1901 – January 30, 1988) was an American screenwriter who worked for Walt Disney Productions, Walter Lantz Productions, Metro-Goldwyn-Mayer cartoon studio, UPA, Larry Harmon Pictures, Cambria Productions and DePatie-Freleng Enterprises. 

Brightman was also the original gag writer for Al Taliaferro's Donald Duck newspaper comic strip from 1938 to 1940, before Bob Karp took over.

Filmography
Homer Brightman worked as a writer except as noted.

References

External links

 

1901 births
1988 deaths
20th-century American screenwriters
Animation screenwriters
Disney comics writers
Walt Disney Animation Studios people
Metro-Goldwyn-Mayer cartoon studio people
Walter Lantz Productions people